Chi Sigma Iota ( or CSI) is the international and professional academic honor society for counseling students, counselor educators, and professional counselors. CSI is an active member of the Association of College Honor Societies (ACHS), where members and the society-at-large are protected by the standards set by ACHS. The society is a professional partner of the American Counseling Association (ACA).

History

CSI was established on January 1, 1985 with the chartering of the Alpha Chapter at Ohio University. In 1988, CSI negotiated with Rho Chi Sigma, the National Rehabilitation Counseling and Services Honor Society, to establish a single honor society for professional counselors. All chapters of Rho Chi Sigma were officially merged into CSI in March 1989.

Dr. Thomas J. Sweeney, Professor Emeritus of Counselor Education at Ohio University, was the founding President and the association’s first Executive Director. Dr. Sweeney retired as Executive Director of CSI in May 2012. CSI Headquarters Staff consists of Dr. Holly Hartwig Moorhead as the current Chief Executive Officer, Dr. Stephen D. Kennedy as the Chief Operating Officer.

Membership
CSI's membership includes both master's and doctoral level graduate students enrolled in counseling programs, professional counselors, and counselor educators. The association's bylaws state that membership is by invitation to students or graduates of an active chapter’s counselor education program.  To be eligible for membership, students must complete at least one semester of full-time graduate coursework in a counselor education degree program, earn a grade point average of 3.5 or higher on a 4.0 system, and be recommended for membership by the chapter as promising for endorsement as a professional counselor whose ethical judgment and behavior will be exemplary. Faculty and alumni of a chapter may be inducted into CSI if they meet the G.P.A. requirement as graduates of a counselor education program and are endorsed by the chapter.

As of February 2020, Chi Sigma Iota has over 130,000 members who have been initiated into the Society through more than 400 chapters that have been chartered throughout our history. We are growing by welcoming over 7,000 new members and chartering new chapters each year. Our members are affiliated with campus-based chapters contributing to their counselor education programs and communities. Chapters are supported at least in part by funding from CSI New chapters of CSI may be established in counselor education training programs accredited by The Council for Accreditation of Counseling and Related Educational Programs (CACREP) or the Council on Rehabilitation Education (CORE) as well as programs that can achieve CACREP or CORE accreditation within the next five years.

Leadership

Each chapter of CSI has a Chapter Faculty Advisor and chapter officers. The Executive Council of CSI includes elected officers (President, President-Elect, Past President, Secretary, and Treasurer), two CSI Leadership Interns, and the Executive Director.  Active members of the Society can volunteer to chair or serve on CSI Committees and Review Panels for grants and awards, all of which receive charges from the Executive Council.  Members may also volunteer to serve on editorial review boards for the CSI Counselors' Bookshelf.

Presidents 
Dr. Amanda La Guardia, 2019-2020

Dr. Nicole Hill, 2018-2019

Dr. Barbara Herlihy, 2017-2018

Dr. Michael Brubaker, 2016-2017

Dr. Spencer Niles, 2015-2016

Dr. Craig Cashwell, 2014-2015

Dr. Andrea Dixon, 2013-2014

Dr. Victoria White Kress, 2012-2013

Dr. Casey A. Barrio Minton, 2011-2012

Dr. JoLynn V. Carney, 2010-2011

Dr. Catharina Y. Chang, 2009-2010

Dr. Donna A. Henderson, 2008-2009

Dr. June M. Williams, 2007-2008

Dr. Cynthia J. Osborn, 2006-2007

Dr. Richard J. Hazler, 2005-2006

Dr. Nancy E. Sherman, 2004-2005

Dr. Jamie S. Carney, 2003-2004

Dr. Geoffrey G. Yager, 2002-2003

Dr. Richard L. Percy, 2001-2002

Dr. Edwin L. Herr, 2000-2001

Dr. Don C. Locke, 1999-2000

Dr. William E. Name, 1998-1999

Dr. Mary Thomas Burke, 1997-1998

Dr. D. L. Warren, 1996-1997

Dr. Courtland C. Lee, 1995-1996

Dr. Judith G. Miranti, 1994-1995

Dr. Nicholas A. Vacc, 1993-1994

Dr. Carol A. Bobby, 1992-1993

Dr. Rose A. Cooper, 1991-1992

Dr. Larry Loesch, 1990-1991

Dr. Samuel T. Gladding, 1989-1990

Dr. Joseph R. Kandor, 1988-1989

Dr. Jane E. Myers, 1987-1988

Dr. Thomas J. Sweeney, 1985-1987

Publications

CSI publishes the Exemplar, a quarterly magazine for members, and the Journal of Counselor Leadership and Advocacy. In addition, selected books are endorsed for publication. Most recently, Professional Counseling Excellence through Leadership and Advocacy was selected for the 2012 Publication in Counselor Education and Supervision Award, given annually by the Association for Counselor Education and Supervision.

The Counselors' Bookshelf is an online compendium of reviews of professional books, fiction, movies and television shows, and music with implications for how counselors can use the various media for personal and professional development as well as helping interventions with clients.

Annual Meetings

International meetings of CSI are held during the Annual Convention of the American Counseling Association. These events include a Business Meeting for representatives from every CSI chapter, a meeting of CSI’s Executive Council, a workshop on leadership, an awards ceremony, and opportunities for networking.

References

External links
 The Chi Sigma Iota official website
  ACHS Chi Sigma Iota entry
  Chi Sigma Iota chapter list at ACHS

Honor societies
Association of College Honor Societies
Student organizations established in 1985
1985 establishments in North Carolina